The men's freestyle 74 kilograms is a competition featured at the 2013 World Wrestling Championships, and was held at the László Papp Budapest Sports Arena in Budapest, Hungary on 18 September 2013.

Results
Legend
C — Won by 3 cautions given to the opponent

Finals

Top half

Section 1

Section 2

Bottom half

Section 3

Section 4

Repechage

References

External links
Results Book, Pages 44–45

Men's freestyle 74 kg